West Bank and Gaza Strip may refer to:

West Bank and Gaza Strip, two areas in the middle east
Palestinian territories, generally A,B and C areas within West Bank and Gaza Strip under control of the Palestinian Authority
State of Palestine, a partially recognized de jure sovereign UN observer state, de facto occupied by Israel
West Bank Areas in the Oslo II Accord
Yesha

See also
Palestinian National Authority
Israeli Civil Administration
Israeli Military Governorate
Status of territories occupied by Israel in 1967
Israeli-occupied territories
Palestine (disambiguation)
Judea and Samaria Area, a term used by Israeli authorities to refer to Area C of the West Bank